The Bird's Nest in Shelby County, Kentucky, about  south of Cropper, Kentucky, was built c.1850.

It includes Greek Revival style.

The listing included two other contributing buildings and a non-contributing building.

The property, with a house on it, was purchased by Philemon Bird from Amos Hall in 1845. Hall's house was demolished when the Bird's Nest house was built in 1850-51.  It was a "family tradition" (meaning there is no documentation) that a Louisville "architect" built the house.

One of Philomen Bird's sons, Henry Bird was given a  parcel across Kentucky Route 43.  A barn on that property is also listed on the National Register, as Bird Octagonal Mule Barn.

The Bird's Nest house property was passed to another of Philemon's sons, George Caldwell Bird, and then to his son, George
Caldwell Bird, Jr.

Its listing followed a 1986-87 study of the historic resources of Shelby County.

The buildings have been demolished or otherwise are no longer on the site. A concrete cylinder remains and possibly house foundations. Intersection of driveway with Cropper Rd., location from which Google Streetview is available: . Supposed location of Bird Octagonal Mule Barn: , which has also apparently disappeared.

Locations may be seen together in Map of all coordinates: OpenStreetMap (clickable link available to the right of this page).

It is located within study area for routing of a new highway connecting Interstate 65 and Interstate 71 avoiding Louisville.

See also
Philomen Bird House, also owned by Philomen Bird and NRHP-listed

References

External links

Greek Revival architecture in Kentucky
National Register of Historic Places in Shelby County, Kentucky
Buildings and structures completed in 1850
Houses in Shelby County, Kentucky
1850 establishments in Kentucky
Demolished but still listed on the National Register of Historic Places
Farms on the National Register of Historic Places in Kentucky
Houses on the National Register of Historic Places in Kentucky